Francesco Compagna (Naples, 31 July 1921 – Capri, 24 July 1982) was an Italian politician, journalist and academic.

He founded the magazine "Nord e Sud" in 1954 and also collaborated with Il Mondo directed by Mario Pannunzio.

Former member of the Italian Liberal Party and the Radical Party, Compagna was elected MP with the Italian Republican Party in the fifth (1968–1972), sixth (1972–1976), seventh (1976–1979) and eighth (1979–1983) legislature.

He served as Minister of Public Works in the Andreotti V (1979) and in the Cossiga II (1980) governments and as Minister of Merchant Navy in the Forlani government (1980–1981).

He also held the position of Undersecretary of State for Extraordinary Interventions in Southern Italy in the Moro IV government (1974–1976) and of Secretary of the Council of Ministers in the Spadolini I government (1981–1982).

He died on Capri in 1982 due to a heart attack.

Publications
A principally political writer, he published the following volumes:
 Labirinto meridionale, Edizioni Neri Pozza
 I terroni in città, Edizioni Laterza
 L'Europa delle regioni, ESI-Edizioni Scientifiche Italiane
 La politica delle città, Laterza
 Le regioni più deboli, Etas-Kompass
 Meridionalismo liberale, Riccardo Ricciardi editore
Il Mezzogiorno nella crisi, Edizioni della Voce.
 Mezzogiorno in salita, Editoriale Nuova

External links

1921 births
1982 deaths
Politicians from Naples
Italian Liberal Party politicians
Radical Party (Italy) politicians
Italian Republican Party politicians
Government ministers of Italy
Deputies of Legislature V of Italy
Deputies of Legislature VI of Italy
Deputies of Legislature VII of Italy
Deputies of Legislature VIII of Italy
Italian magazine founders
Academic staff of the University of Naples Federico II